Green Sky may refer to:

Green Sky Adventures, an American aircraft manufacturer based in Hawthorne, Florida
Green Sky Trilogy, a series of fantasy novels by Zilpha Keatley Snyder